Dane Rampe (born 2 June 1990) is an Australian rules football player who plays for the Sydney Swans in the Australian Football League (AFL). He has served as co-captain of the Swans since the 2019 season.

Early life
Rampe was born in Sydney and grew up in Clovelly, New South Wales. His grandparents and father had migrated to Sydney from Estonia. Rampe grew up near to the SCG and attended the Sydney Swans vs.  match in which Tony Lockett kicked his record-breaking 1,300th AFL goal as one of the hundreds who flooded the field when it occurred. He credits this event as converting him in to a passionate Swans fan, following this he became a regular at matches and idolised Brett Kirk, Adam Goodes and Jude Bolton The Swans-West Coast Eagles rivalry also inspired an intense passion for AFL.  

Rampe was educated at Newington College where he played basketball and soccer. An obvious athletic talent, his school asked him to switch from soccer to rugby union at age 17. However being an AFL fan, in 2012 he decided to try the sport at club level with the UNSW-Eastern Suburbs Bulldogs. He was soon noticed by AFL talent scouts and signed on to the Sydney Swans Academy. Determined to make a career out of the sport Rampe nominated for the AFL draft, but after being overlooked, moved to Melbourne to attempt to gain entry to the league through pursue a career in the sport. He spent three seasons in the Victorian Football League (VFL) with Williamstown helping them win the inaugural Foxtel Cup and playing in the 2011 VFL Grand Final. He was twice invited to train with the Western Bulldogs in the preseason. The Bulldogs, however, snubbed him in the 2010 AFL Draft. Feeling he had missed his chance to break into the AFL he returned to Sydney. In 2012 he played for UNSW-Eastern Suburbs Bulldogs in the Sydney AFL and won the Phelan medal as the best player in the league for the season. His performance earned the notice of the Swans and as a Swans Academy product he was offered a spot on Sydney's rookie list in the 2012 AFL Draft.

AFL career
Rampe made his debut for the Swans in 2013 and went on to play 23 games in that season. His standout game was in Round 11 against the Adelaide Crows where he had 18 disposals (11 kicks, 7 handballs) along with 4 marks and 4 tackles in his sides impressive 127 to 50 victory. In 2016, he was named All-Australian.

In March 2017, Rampe injured himself while out jogging. He fell and broke his arm. On 24 May 2017, it was announced that he would wear number 50 on his guernsey, rather than his usual 24, for the round 10 Sir Doug Nicholls Indigenous Round game against . This was to commemorate the 50th anniversary of the 1967 referendum ( which allowed Indigenous Australians to be counted with the general population in the census).

Rampe had a banner 2019 season, albeit not without some controversy. He was appointed co-captain alongside Josh Kennedy and Luke Parker prior to the season, and he won his first best-and-fairest award for the Swans after playing all but one match for the year. He gained notoriety during the year when he jumped onto a goalpost after the Round 8 match against Essendon to stop David Myers from trying to kick a goal after the siren.

In 2020, Rampe had another excellent year in defence, although impeded significantly with a broken hand sustained in Rd 8 against Hawthorn. Remarkably he had continued to play another four games with the injury, before further damage led to a premature end to his season. His courage over continuing to play with the injury lead to him being awarded the Robert Rose Award for Most Courageous Player at the end of the season.

Statistics
Updated to the end of the 2022 season.

|-
| 2013 ||  || 43
| 23 || 1 || 2 || 205 || 95 || 300 || 67 || 60 || 0.0 || 0.1 || 8.9 || 4.1 || 13.0 || 2.9 || 2.6 || 0
|-
| 2014 ||  || 24
| 25 || 3 || 2 || 245 || 152 || 397 || 93 || 76 || 0.1 || 0.1 || 9.8 || 6.1 || 15.9 || 3.7 || 3.0 || 0
|-
| 2015 ||  || 24
| 24 || 1 || 3 || 284 || 172 || 456 || 137 || 60 || 0.0 || 0.1 || 11.8 || 7.2 || 19.0 || 5.7 || 2.5 || 0
|-
| 2016 ||  || 24
| 26 || 1 || 2 || 303 || 175 || 478 || 141 || 63 || 0.0 || 0.1 || 11.7 || 6.7 || 18.4 || 5.4 || 2.4 || 2
|-
| 2017 ||  || 24
| 17 || 0 || 1 || 165 || 117 || 282 || 99 || 32 || 0.0 || 0.1 || 9.7 || 6.9 || 16.6 || 5.8 || 1.9 || 2
|-
| 2018 ||  || 24
| 23 || 0 || 1 || 231 || 155 || 386 || 123 || 55 || 0.0 || 0.1 || 10.0 || 6.7 || 16.8 || 5.4 || 2.4 || 1
|-
| 2019 ||  || 24
| 21 || 0 || 1 || 165 || 156 || 421 || 123 || 60 || 0.0 || 0.1 || 12.6 || 7.4 || 18.4 || 5.9 || 2.9 || 0
|-
| 2020 ||  || 24
| 11 || 0 || 0 || 105 || 55 || 160 || 42 || 15 || 0.0 || 0.0 || 9.5 || 5.0 || 14.5 || 3.8 || 1.4 || 1
|-
| 2021 ||  || 24
| 20 || 0 || 1 || 248 || 113 || 361 || 123 || 34 || 0.0 || 0.0 || 12.4 || 5.6 || 18.0 || 6.1 || 1.7 || 0
|-
| 2022 ||  || 24
| 25 || 1 || 0 || 223 || 99 || 322 || 118 || 49 || 0.0 || 0.0 || 8.9 || 4.0 || 12.9 || 4.7 || 2.0 || 0
|- class=sortbottom
! colspan=3 | Career
! 215 !! 7 !! 13 !! 2274 !! 1289 !! 3563 !! 1066 !! 504 !! 0.0 !! 0.1 !! 10.6 !! 6.0 !! 16.6 !! 5.0 !! 2.3 !! 6
|}

Honours and achievements
Team
 2× McClelland Trophy: 2014, 2016

Individual
 Sydney captain: 2019–
 Bob Skilton Medal: 2019
 All-Australian team: 2016

References

External links

1990 births
Living people
Sydney Swans players
People educated at Newington College
Australian rules footballers from New South Wales
Williamstown Football Club players
UNSW-Eastern Suburbs Bulldogs players
All-Australians (AFL)
Australian people of Estonian descent
Bob Skilton Medal winners